The Broadsword and the Beast is the 14th studio album by rock band Jethro Tull, released on 10 April 1982. The album is a cross between the dominant synthesizer sound of the 1980s and the folk-influenced style that Jethro Tull used in the previous decade. As such, the band's characteristic acoustic instrumentation is augmented by electronic soundscapes, provided by new keyboardist Peter-John Vettese. The electronic aspects of this album would be explored further by the band on their next release, Under Wraps.

In the liner notes of the remastered version of the album, Ian Anderson opines that Broadsword contains some of Jethro Tull's best music.

Album information
The cover art is by artist Iain McCaig, a longtime fan of Jethro Tull. The art was made after discussions with Ian Anderson, and was illustrated to capture the concept of the music. McCaig has stated that he intentionally drew hidden "easter eggs" in the album art.

The edges of the cover art feature writing in the runic alphabet used by J. R. R. Tolkien in The Hobbit, and translate to the opening verse of the song "Broadsword":
"I see a dark sail on the horizon,
set under a black cloud that hides the sun.
Bring me my broadsword and clear understanding. 
Bring me my cross of gold as a talisman."

The album was going to be called Beastie, corresponding to the first track on side one. But during production, the band deliberated over the preference between Beastie and Broadsword, the first track on side two. In the end, they decided (as on Aqualung) to give each side its own title and thus its own identity, and this time to combine both in the album title. As the artwork also puts much more emphasis on Broadsword, many owners and fans also refer to it as the Broadsword album.

Release
In 1984, Mobile Fidelity Sound Lab issued a half-speed mastered edition of the album (MFSL 1-092) which was a minor seller at the time.

The 2005 CD reissue of the album was heavily expanded to include eight bonus tracks recorded during the Broadsword sessions, but not included in the original 1982 album.

Live performance

The tour for Broadsword was the last of the band's to be exceedingly theatrical. It included the entire stage being decorated to look like a pirate ship, which Ian Anderson, as he said in the liner notes for the remastered CD, thought was "very silly". Extensive notes on the production of the album and subsequent tour can be found at the official Jethro Tull website.

In a 1982 concert review, Chris Welch reported: "Squire Anderson waved a huge broadsword dangerously near Martin's nether extremities during songs from their latest album (The Broadsword And The Beast), and punted huge exploding balloons out into the audience. But it was the roar of the band as they got into their heaviest moments that ultimately captivated an audience who seemed evenly mixed between 14-year-old novice Tull freaks and silver-haired rock business veterans. [...] Tull have a vast library of music to perform. They could have played on for another two hours and the audience would have been with them, cheering all the way."

"Cheerio", the final track of the original release, was for some years played as the final encore at Jethro Tull concerts.

Critical reception

The review by Kerrang! was ambiguous, calling the album tracks "emotional pieces of composition depending on how much attention you are prepared to give" but overall stated that "If you're a fan, buy it, it may have some pleasant surprises. If, like me, you're not, borrow it from someone who is. You might be surprised too". Rolling Stone magazine, in their two stars review stated: "There's nothing wrong with living in the past, perhaps. Indeed, Ian Anderson can make the wisdom of the ages seem preferable to the rootless philandering of the present day. But on The Broadsword and the Beast, the real beast may be Anderson's penchant for ponderous sermonizing." Bruce Eder of AllMusic was not too impressed with the album. Recalling the production and the music overall, he stated that "this time in the hands of ex-Yardbird Paul Samwell-Smith, is smoother, less heavy, and more thinly textured than their past work, and there are times  most especially on "Flying Colours"  where they could almost pass for the latter-day Moody Blues, something the band never would have permitted in earlier days".

Former Genesis guitarist Steve Hackett has stated that The Broadsword and the Beast is one of his favourite albums.

Overall sales for The Broadsword and the Beast were better than Stormwatch and A. The album charted at No. 14 in Germany and Norway, No. 19 in the United States and No. 27 in the UK, while the single "Fallen On Hard Times" was a modest hit, reaching No. 20 on the US Billboard Mainstream Rock Tracks Chart.

Track listing

The remastered CD added bonus tracks (which had been on the 20 Years of Jethro Tull box-set) and extensive liner notes. Further tracks from the same sessions (and not included on the remastered CD) are "Motoreyes" (from the 20 Years box) and "Crew Nights", "The Curse", "Commons Brawl", "No Step", "Drive On The Young Side of Life", and "Lights Out" from the outtakes album Nightcap.

Personnel
Jethro Tull
 Ian Anderson – lead vocals, flute, acoustic guitar, Fairlight CMI
 Martin Barre – acoustic guitar, electric guitar
 Dave Pegg – backing vocals, bass guitar, mandolin
 Peter-John Vettese – backing vocals, keyboards, piano, synthesizer
 Gerry Conway – drums, percussion

Additional personnel
 Robin Black - sound engineering
 Jim Gibson - artwork
 Leigh Mantle - assistant engineer
 Iain McCaig - artwork, illustrations
 Paul Samwell-Smith - producer

Charts

Weekly charts

Year-end charts

Certifications

References

External links
 The Broadsword and the Beast at discogs.

1982 albums
Chrysalis Records albums
Albums produced by Paul Samwell-Smith
Jethro Tull (band) albums